Austin Head is a headland  north-northwest of Leon Head, projecting into Undine South Harbour on the south coast of South Georgia. It was surveyed by the South Georgia Survey in the period 1951–57, and named by the UK Antarctic Place-Names Committee for Elijah Austin, a leading merchant of New Haven, Connecticut, USA, who sent out the first two American sealing vessels to South Georgia in 1790.

References

Headlands of South Georgia